Pied myna has been split into three species:

 Indian pied myna, Gracupica contra
 Siamese pied myna, Gracupica floweri
 Javan pied myna, Gracupica jalla

Birds by common name